Norman Canadians are Canadians whose ancestors came from the Duchy of Normandy.

List of Norman Canadians and notable Norman settlers
 Pierre de Chauvin de Tonnetuit: naval captain, lieutenant of New France and governor.
 Charles le Moyne de Longueuil et de Châteauguay: officer and merchant who was a prominent figure in the early days of Montreal.
 René-Robert Cavelier, Sieur de La Salle, colonist, namesake of LaSalle, Quebec.
 Pierre Boucher: Governor of Trois-Rivières, namesake of Boucherville.
 Jean Brebeuf: missionary, wrote a grammar and dictionary in the Wyandot language.
 Guillaume Couture: missionary, translator, diplomat, militia captain.
 Jacques Le Ber: merchant and lord at Montreal.
 Julien Dubuque: third generation Norman Canadian, namesake of Dubuque, Iowa.
 Charles Hus, dit Millet third generation Norman Canadian, political figure.
 Joseph Marie LaBarge, Senior: third generation Norman Canadian, frontiersman, trapper and fur trader.

List surnames of Norman origin found in Canada
More than two million people in Quebec have a name of Norman origin.
Anctil: a variant spelling of Anquetil.
Bellemare: common family name in Mauricie.
Bérubé: originates in the Pays de Caux.
Carpentier: a surname from Picardy and Upper Normandy.
Coté
Gagné
Gagnon
Hébert: Norman variant of Herbert.
Normand
Talbot
Ratelle (Ratel "Dit Dragon") a name from Rouen.
Tremblay
Trépanier.

List of Canadian places named after places in Normandy
Dieppe, New Brunswick: named in the memory of the 913 Canadians who were killed during the Dieppe Raid in the Second World War.
Honfleur, Quebec

References

 

Guernsey diaspora
Jersey diaspora
Norman diaspora